Gaunspur is a village in Kapurthala district of Punjab State, India.

Gaunspur may also refer to:
Gaunspur (Ludhiana West)  is a village located in the Ludhiana West tehsil, of Ludhiana district, Punjab.